The 1911 German football championship, the 9th edition of the competition, was won by Viktoria 89 Berlin, defeating VfB Leipzig 3–1 in the final.

For Viktoria it was the second national championship, having previously won the 1908 edition. Together with two losing finals in 1907 and 1909 it marked the end of the club's most successful era and also equaled VfB Leipzigs record of two championships won. Leipzig, champions in 1903 and 1906 would twice more appear in the final, winning in 1913 and losing in 1914.

Viktoria's Willy Worpitzky was the top scorer of the 1911 championship with four goals.

Eight clubs qualified for the competition played in knock-out format, the champions of each of the eight regional football championships. It was the last season where two rival football associations from Berlin send their champions to the German championship, with the two merging at the end of the season.

Qualified teams
The teams qualified through the regional championships:

Competition

Quarter-finals
The quarter-finals, played on 7 May 1911:

|}
 ‡ Game not played, awarded to Viktoria 89 Berlin.

Semi-finals
The semi-finals, played on 21 May 1911:

|}

Final

References

Sources
 kicker Allmanach 1990, by kicker, page 160 to 178 – German championship
 Süddeutschlands Fussballgeschichte in Tabellenform 1897-1988  History of Southern German football in tables, publisher & author: Ludolf Hyll

External links
 German Championship 1910–11 at weltfussball.de 
 German Championship 1911 at RSSSF

German football championship seasons
1
German